NGC 4420 is an unbarred spiral galaxy located 77 million light-years away in the constellation Virgo. It is a member of the M61 Group of galaxies, which is a member of the Virgo II Groups, a series of galaxies and galaxy clusters strung out from the southern edge of the Virgo Supercluster.

References

External links 
 
 

Unbarred spiral galaxies
Virgo (constellation)
4420
07549
40775